Seo Bong-soo (born February 1, 1953) is a professional Go player.

Biography 
Seo Bong-soo turned professional in 1970. By 1986 he became the 4th ever Korean 9 dan. He was Cho Hunhyun's biggest rival in the 1980s and frequently challenged Cho in major title events. During their career, Seo and Cho played against each other in more than 350 official games, which is a world record. He was a part of the "Gang of Four" of Korean Go in 1990s, the rest being Cho Hunhyun, Lee Chang-ho, and Yoo Changhyuk. He made an amazing run of wins in 1997 during the 5th SBS Cup. He played as fourth captain for Korea, and singlehandedly beat the entire Chinese team as well as what was left of the Japanese team--a winning streak of 9 straight games.

Titles 
Ranks #6-t in total number of titles in Korea.

References

External links
 Interview

1953 births
Living people
South Korean Go players